Central Middle School may refer to a number of middle schools:

In Canada:
 Central Middle School (Victoria), in Victoria, British Columbia

In the United States:
 Central Middle School of Science (Anchorage, Alaska)
 Central Middle School (San Carlos, California)
 Central Middle School (Dover, Delaware)
 Central Middle School (Melbourne, Florida)
 Central Middle School (Honolulu, Hawaii)
 Central Middle School (Kokomo, Indiana)
 Central Middle School (Muscatine, Iowa)
 Central Middle School (Quincy, Massachusetts)
 Central Middle School (Edgewater, Maryland)
 Central Middle School (Midland, Michigan)
 Central Middle School (Kansas City, Missouri)
 Central Middle School (Parsippany, New Jersey)
 Central Middle School (Devils Lake, North Dakota)
 Central Middle School (Galveston, Texas)
 Central Middle School (Elgin, Illinois)
 Central Middle School (Evergreen Park, IL)

See also
 Central Junior High School (disambiguation)